Dance Baby Dance is a 2018 American drama film directed by Stephen Kogon, starring Kogon, Beverley Mitchell, Hayley Shukiar, Clare Grant, Jim O'Heir and Carlos Alazraqui.

Cast
 Stephen Kogon as Jimmy Percer
 Beverley Mitchell as Tess Percer
 Hayley Shukiar as Kit
 Clare Grant as Camille
 Jim O'Heir as Mr. Dalrymple
 Carlos Alazraqui as Hector
 Lisa Brenner as Lanie
 Isaiah Lucas as Ravon
 Leah Cevoli as Cindy
 Michelle Thomson as Veronica
 Ellen Kim as Sherry
 Jim Nowakowski as Dex
 Aaron DeWayne Williams as Kevin

Reception
Alan Ng of Film Threat gave the film a score of 1.5/5 and wrote that while Mitchell is "strong enough to carry Kogon to make their scenes together tolerable", Kogon "prevents the serious moments the film needs from being taken seriously". Ng also called the choreography "mediocre at best" and the cinematography "just as uninspired as the dancing."

Kimber Myers of the Los Angeles Times wrote that the film "doesn’t just suffer from a predictable script; basic tenets of cinematography, lighting and editing are either ignored by or unfamiliar to those behind the camera."

References

External links
 
 

American drama films
2018 drama films